Sam Brand may refer to:

 Samantha Brand (born 1988), Haitian football midfielder
 Sam Brand (cyclist) (born 1995), Manx cyclist